The 2015 Akron Zips football team represented the University of Akron in the 2015 NCAA Division I FBS football season. They were led by fourth-year head coach Terry Bowden and played their home games at InfoCision Stadium–Summa Field. They were members of the East Division of the Mid-American Conference. They finished the season 8–5, 5–3 in MAC play to finish in a tie for second place in the East Division. They were invited to the Famous Idaho Potato Bowl,  where they defeated Utah State for their first ever bowl victory. This was Akron's fourth bowl appearance. Previous bowl games are: Grantland Rice Bowl 1968, Pioneer Bowl 1976, Motor City Bowl 2005. They made their fifth bowl game appearance in 2017 at the Boca Raton Cheribundi Bowl.

Schedule

Game summaries

at Oklahoma

Pittsburgh

Savannah State

at Louisiana–Lafayette

Ohio

at Eastern Michigan

at Bowling Green

Central Michigan

at Massachusetts

at Miami (OH)

Buffalo

Kent State

Utah State–Famous Idaho Potato Bowl

Roster

References

Akron
Akron Zips football seasons
Famous Idaho Potato Bowl champion seasons
Akron Zips football